Alex Bryce (1905–1961) was a British screenwriter, cinematographer and film director.

Selected filmography 
Director
 Sexton Blake and the Mademoiselle (1935)
 Wedding Group (1936)
 Servants All (1936)
 The Big Noise (1936)
 The End of the Road (1936)
 The Black Tulip (1937)
 The Londonderry Air (1938)
 My Irish Molly (1938)
 The Last Barricade (1938)

Cinematographer
 The Ringer (1931)
 The Sport of Kings (1931)
 Sally in Our Alley (1931)
 The Old Man (1931)
 A Honeymoon Adventure (1931)
 Sally Bishop (1932)
 That's My Wife (1933)
 The Stickpin (1933)
 Cleaning Up (1933)
 This Is the Life (1933)
 On the Air (1934)
 Passing Shadows (1934)
 Gay Love (1934)
 Without You (1934)
 Flat Number Three (1934)
 Blue Smoke (1935)
 Late Extra (1935)
 His Majesty and Company (1935)
 Ten Minute Alibi (1935)
 The Deputy Drummer (1935)

References

External links 
 

1905 births
1961 deaths
British film directors
Scottish film directors
People from Larbert